De Biker Boys is a comical mockumentary, broadcast in 2014 by the Belgian public broadcasting company Eén and produced by Koeken Troef.

Story 

Three well known Flemish television stars (Bart De Pauw, Ben Segers and Jonas Van Geel) intend to make a travel programme in search of the origins of the Vespa in Italy. Unfortunately, during the filming everything that can go wrong, actually goes wrong, not in the least due to the inefficiency of fixer Haldis. The television makers are required to use their creativity to bring the production to a good end.

The programme is a parody of similar travel programmes on Belgian television (Vlaanderen Vakantieland, De Bende van Wim).

Although the programme had an average of 1.3 million viewers, some television critics were more critical.

Cast

External links 
 Official Website
 Facebook

References

 

2014 Belgian television series debuts
2014 Belgian television series endings
Belgian mockumentary television series
Flemish television shows
Eén original programming